Simonini may refer to:

Simonini Racing,  Italian automotive and aircraft engine manufacturer
Simonini, a number of engines manufactured by Simonini Racing
Simonini (surname)
Simonini reaction

See also

Simoncini